Aisam-ul-Haq Qureshi is a professional tennis player who is the current Pakistani number one doubles player. He has reached two major finals in total: (1 Doubles, 1 Mixed), both at the 2010 US Open. Qureshi has been ranked as high as world No. 8 in the ATP doubles rankings.

Qureshi made his professional tennis debut on the main tour at the Chennai Open in 2001. So far in his career, Qureshi has won a total of 16 doubles titles.

Below is a list of career achievements and titles won by Aisam-ul-Haq Qureshi.

Significant finals

Grand Slam tournament finals

Doubles: 1 (1 runner-up)

Mixed doubles: 1 (1 runner-up)

Masters 1000 finals

Doubles: 3 (2 titles, 1 runner-up)

ATP career finals

Doubles: 42 (18 titles, 24 runners-up)

Other career finals

Singles

Doubles

Challengers and Futures finals

Singles: 22 (16–6)

Doubles: 83 (46–37)

Career performance timeline
Source for the following tables:

Singles

Doubles

Mixed doubles

References
General
Career finals, Grand Slam tournament seedings, information for the performance timelines, top 10 wins and national participation information have been taken from these sources:

 
  
  
  
  
  
  
  
  

  
  
  
  
  
  
  
  
 

Specific

Qureshi, Aisam-Ul-Haq
Tennis in Pakistan